Georgios Ginis is an electrical engineer with ASSIA, Inc. in San Mateo, California. He was named a Fellow of the Institute of Electrical and Electronics Engineers (IEEE) in 2013 for his contributions to transmission optimization in digital subscriber loops.

References 

Fellow Members of the IEEE
Living people
Year of birth missing (living people)
Place of birth missing (living people)
American electrical engineers